Charles Francis Dolan (born October 16, 1926) is an American billionaire businessman, best known as founder of Cablevision and HBO. Today, Dolan controls Madison Square Garden Sports, MSG Networks, Madison Square Garden Entertainment, Madison Square Garden, MSG Sphere at The Venetian, MSG Sphere London, Radio City Music Hall, BBC America and AMC Networks. As of October 2021, his net worth was estimated at US$5.6 billion.

Early life
The son of an inventor, Dolan was born in Cleveland, Ohio, United States. He served in the United States Army Air Forces at the end of World War II and studied at John Carroll University, before dropping out and entering the telecommunications field. His father, David, sold a patent to Ford Motor.

Career
Dolan's earliest professional endeavors focused on the packaging, marketing and distribution of sports and industrial films, which he produced with his wife in their Cleveland home and then sold to televisions stations which syndicated the material. Dolan sold his interests to Telenews in exchange for a job, and when he was 26 years old, he moved to New York and founded Teleguide Inc, a service that provided information to hotels.

That same decade, Dolan founded Sterling Manhattan Cable, the first company to wire buildings to have cable television access. In its early years, Sterling forged first-of-its-kind agreements to bring New York professional sports teams, cultural programming and movies into the homes of New York City cable viewers, including agreements with the New York Knicks and New York Rangers. Two years later, he sold Sterling Cable's Manhattan operations to Time Inc and renamed his Long Island business Cablevision Systems.

In the early 1970s, Dolan founded Home Box Office, the first premium programming service in the cable television industry, which he sold to Time Life. Later, he organized Cablevision Systems Corporation on Long Island and has spearheaded many of the company's advancements. After that, he was the vision behind VOOM, Cablevision's effort to expand content delivery and meet the demands of the exploding HDTV market, which was expected to include six million households by the end of 2003 and 12 million by year-end 2005, but was shut down when other directors deemed it financially unsustainable.

From 2001 through early 2002, Dolan was a bidder in the sale of the Boston Red Sox. He submitted a maximum bid of $750 million, but ultimately lost out to a group headed by John Henry, Tom Werner, and Larry Lucchino.

In 2016, Dolan sold Cablevision to Patrick Drahi's Altice USA for $17.7 billion.

Affiliations and honors
 Dolan is a trustee of Fairfield University and is also a member of the board of governors of St. Francis Hospital in Port Washington, New York.
 In November 2016, Dolan received an honorary doctorate from Fairfield University, in recognition of his remarkable contribution to our culture industry, for his exemplary vision and tenacity as a media pioneer, and for his important contribution to Fairfield University as a trustee and donor who has supported scholarship funds and the Charles F. Dolan School of Business.

Personal life
Dolan and his wife, Helen Ann, reside in Oyster Bay, Long Island, New York. They have six children, including James L. Dolan, who is executive chairman of the Madison Square Garden Company and its professional sports teams, the New York Knicks and New York Rangers, and Patrick Dolan, principal owner and publisher of Newsday.

Charles Dolan's younger brother, Larry Dolan, and his nephew, Paul Dolan, own the Cleveland Guardians.

Politics
Dolan contributed to Donald Trump's 2020 reelection campaign.

Donations
The Fairfield University Dolan School of Business at Fairfield University is named in recognition of Dolan's $25 million donation in 2000 and his service to the university as a member of the board of trustees.

The Dolan Center for Science and Technology is John Carroll University's showcase building. Completed in 2003 at a cost of over $66 million, it houses JCU's science departments, including Mathematics and Computer Science.

References

1926 births
Living people
American billionaires
American cable television company founders
HBO people
Dolan family
John Carroll University alumni
Fairfield University alumni
New York Rangers owners
Businesspeople from Cleveland
Military personnel from Cleveland
United States Army Air Forces personnel of World War II